My Heart's in the Highlands is a 1789 Scottish song and poem by Robert Burns.

My Heart's in the Highlands may also refer to:
My Heart's in the Highlands (play), 1939 one-act play by Armenian-American author William Saroyan
My Heart's in the Highlands (album), 1954 collection of Scottish love songs by American singer Jo Stafford
"My Heart's in the Highlands", November 7, 1960 adaptation of Saroyan's play on The Play of the Week

See also
My Heart Is in the Highlands, 1975 Armenian drama film based on Saroyan's play